Broadcasters for the Washington Nationals Major League Baseball team.

Television

Current announcers
Bob Carpenter, play-by-play announcer, 2006–present; pre-game and post-game commentator, 2021
Dan Kolko, field reporter, 2014–2018; studio host, 2019–2020; pre-game, in-game, and post game anchor, 2021; substitute play-by-play announcer, 2021–present; substitute color commentator, 2021
Drew Goldfarb, sports betting analyst and pregame sports betting segment host, 2021
Justin Maxwell, substitute studio host, 2019–2020; substitute color commentator, 2021
Kevin Frandsen, primary color commentator 2022–present
Grant Paulsen, substitute color commentator, 2021 
Alex Chappell, field reporter, 2019–2020; substitute pre-game and post-game anchor, 2021
Dave Jageler, substitute play-by-play announcer
Mark Zuckerman, substitute pre-game and post-game anchor, 2021
Paul Mancano, substitute pre-game and post-game anchor, 2021
Ryan Zimmerman, substitute color commentator, 2022–present
Charlie Slowes, substitute play-by-play announcer

Former announcers
Mel Proctor, play-by-play, 2005
Ron Darling, color commentator, 2005
Kenny Albert, play-by-play, 2005 (when Proctor was unavailable)
Jack Voigt, color commentator, 2005 (when Darling was unavailable)
Tom Paciorek, color commentator, 2006
Don Sutton, color commentator, 2007–2008
Don Baylor, substitute studio analyst, 2007 (when Ray Knight was unavailable)
Rob Dibble, color commentator, 2009–2010
Debbi Taylor, field reporter, 2007–2011
F. P. Santangelo, color commentator, 2011–2021, pre-game and post-game commentator, 2021
Kristina Akra, field reporter, 2012
Julie Alexandria, field reporter, 2013
Ray Knight, studio analyst, substitute color commentator, 2007–2018
Johnny Holliday, studio host, substitute play-by-play announcer, 2007–2018
Phil Wood, substitute studio analyst, 2008–2020
Michael Morse, substitute studio analyst and substitute color commentator, 2018–2020
Alex Parker, substitute studio host, 2018–2020
Carol Maloney, substitute field reporter and substitute studio host, 2019–2020
Byron Kerr, substitute studio host, 2007–2020
Bo Porter, studio analyst, 2019–2020

Broadcast outlets

When the Nationals arrived in Washington, D. C., the Mid-Atlantic Sports Network (MASN) acquired the television rights for almost all Nationals games. However, MASN was not available to most people in the Nationals broadcast area for nearly all of the first two seasons of play.  Some of the games were also televised on WDCA, mostly on weekends.

While MASN continued to televise nearly every Nationals game, the number of WDCA telecasts decreased to approximately 30 in 2006, mostly on Friday nights.  By 2007, the number of over-the-air games was down to approximately 20. MASN's broadcast partner switched from WDCA to WDCW from 2009 to 2012. In 2013, WUSA became MASN's over-the-air broadcast partner for 20 Nationals games a year–all weekend games except for Opening Day. In 2018, over-the-air broadcasts ended, and all games now air exclusively on MASN unless picked up for national broadcast.

Radio

Current announcers
Charlie Slowes, 2005–present
Dave Jageler, 2006–present
Pete Medhurst, 2019–present (seven games in 2019)
Phil Wood, radio post-game show host, 2008–present
Craig Heist, substitute radio post-game show host

Former announcers
Kevin Brown (as needed), 2017
Dave Shea, 2005

Broadcast outlets

Since the 2011 season, the Nationals' flagship radio station has been WJFK-FM, "106.7 The Fan", which is owned and operated by Audacy after then-Entercom's purchase of CBS Radio. Most games also are simulcast on WFED, "Federal News Radio," at 1500 and 820 AM, which is owned by Hubbard Broadcasting after its purchase of the station from Bonneville International and was the flagship station of the Nationals from the first season in Washington (2005) through the 2010 season.  Whenever WFED cannot air a game due to a conflict, that game airs on WJFK's sister station WJFK (1580 AM, "CBS Sports Radio 1580").

See also
 List of current Major League Baseball broadcasters
 List of Montreal Expos broadcasters

See also

Washington Nationals
 
Broadcasters
Mid-Atlantic Sports Network